Rise provides microfinancing and mentorship to entrepreneurs living with mental health and addiction challenges who are interested in pursuing self-employment. Business loans, leases, and other investments are offered depending on the stage of development, needs and capacity of each business. Rise provides business financing up to $25,000 throughout Ontario, with financing averaging from $3000 to $5000. The Rotman School of Management and Centre for Addiction and Mental Health participate in advisory functions, lending their respective expertise for business mentoring and mental health supports and services to the benefit of Rise clients. In January 2012, Rise received the Social Entrepreneurship in Mental Health Equity Award for Toronto social enterprises advancing mental health equity.

History
Sandra Rotman founded Rise Asset Development.  She brought to the table the Rotman School and Management (University of Toronto) and Ontario's world-leading Centre for Addiction and Mental Health (CAMH)  for their respective expertise.

Through initial funding from Sandra Rotman, Rise conducted a pilot to assist entrepreneurs living with mental health and addiction challenges to explore self-employment and build successful, self-sustaining small businesses.

In 2009, the initial pilot successfully helped a small group of emerging entrepreneurs to access investment capital, business mentoring and support. The pilot confirmed that the financial assistance and supports offered by Rise could help grow small business while improving the outlook of a marginalized segment of the community. The program has allowed certain clients to graduate from Ontario Disability Support Program and become more self-sufficient.

In 2012, the Ontario Ministry of Youth Services announced that they formed a new partnership with Rise to create a program that targets youth living with mental health and addiction challenges. The goal of this initiative is to work with fifty young entrepreneurs between the ages of 16 and 29 over three years. Rise will deliver the program and provide microfinancing while Ontario will finance the business training for entrepreneurs.

Over the same year, Rise expanded services to Ottawa and other Ontario communities.  Rise is working alongside Causeway Work Centre to deliver microfinancing in the Ottawa region with the support from Alterna Savings.

The rapid success of Rise has attracted other funders, including Citi Canada (the Canadian branch of New-York based Citibank) and the Royal Bank of Canada.

In addition, Rise has launched a pilot group-lending program with the help of Citi Foundation.

Mental Health and Addiction & Self-Employment

Health Canada estimates that 1 in 5 Ontarians will experience serious mental health or a substance abuse issue in their lifetime. In 2007–08, Ontario spent more than $2.5 billion on mental health and addiction services.

Employment has been identified as a leading component in promoting positive mental health and supporting a fulfilling life in the community. Individuals who return to work demonstrate significant improvements in self-esteem and symptom management when compared with those who do not work. For most people, meaningful employment is a key element in their economic, social and personal lives. However, individuals living with mental illness and addictions face many barriers in finding and maintaining employment. Stigma is often the most prohibitive.

In 2001, a group of 149 unemployed clients with severe mental illness received vocational rehabilitation and were assessed on the effects of work on psychiatric symptoms, quality of life, and self-esteem at 6-month intervals throughout the 18-month study.  Participants were classified into 4 groups: competitive work, sheltered work, minimal work, and no work. The competitive group showed significantly higher rates of improvement than the other groups. The larger body of research on employment for people with mental illness leads us to a multitude of studies confirming this finding.

Self-employment can be an appropriate employment strategy to overcome the high unemployment rate among this population. Entrepreneurship can also facilitate the generation of supplementary income to assist people living with mental illness and addictions improve their quality of life and economic well-being. 54% of persons in self-employment had held their job for over 12 months compared to 35% of people in employment through an employer, and people in self-employment more closely mirrored the general population in terms of the job sectors in which they work.

Program
Rise provides loans, leases, and lines of credits and other financial products. The term of the loan is up to 3 years. The average loan size is $3000 to $5000. Rise also provides their clients with a business mentorship and support. The program is targeted towards people with mental health and addiction challenges who cannot get loans through traditional means due to bad credit history or lack of funds.

In June 2012, Rise launched its Youth Small Business Program which targets young adults between the ages of 16 and 29. This business training program is offered to individuals living with a mental health or addiction challenge and provides a $500 start up grant for their businesses. Upon completion of the program, entrepreneurs may be eligible for traditional Rise financing.

Rise strives to add dimensions to the often 'single story' of people with mental health and addiction challenges. With that in perspective, Rise Asset Developments will commit over $200,000 in financing to entrepreneurs living with mental illness and addictions throughout Ontario (Canada) in 2013. Rise will scale its model to three new cities within Ontario, grow its mentorship program across the province, build a targeted youth program and pilot a group lending product targeting transitional homes, community housing and existing peer mental health or addiction support groups.

Mission
Recognizing the interdependency of financial well being to one's overall quality of life, Rise works to empower business owners with access to financing and business support. Rise is committed to improving the lives of people who are unable to secure employment due to mental health or addiction challenges.

Future
Having proved that people with mental health challenges can run viable businesses, Rise is expanding its program across the province. Rise has launched its operations in Ottawa through the Causeway Work Centre.

See also
 Rotman School of Management
 Centre for Addiction and Mental Health
 Accion USA
 Grameen Bank
 Grameen America
 Project Enterprise

External links
 Rise Asset Development
 Rotman School of Management
 Centre for Addiction and Mental Health

References

Microfinance organizations
Financial services companies of Canada
Companies based in Toronto